The 1852 United States presidential election in South Carolina took place on November 2, 1852, as part of the 1852 United States presidential election. The state legislature chose 9 representatives, or electors to the Electoral College, who voted for President and Vice President.

South Carolina cast eight electoral votes for the Democratic candidate Franklin Pierce. These electors were chosen by the South Carolina General Assembly, the state legislature, rather than by popular vote.

Results

References

South Carolina
1852
1852 South Carolina elections